Events from the year 1725 in Russia

Births

Pyotr Rumyantsev (died 1796)

Deaths

 Peter I, monarch (born 1672)

References

1725 in the Russian Empire
Years of the 18th century in the Russian Empire